Jolljepunco (possibly from Quechua qullqi money, silver, p'unqu pond, reservoir, tank; dam, "silver pond"), Colquepunco (possibly from Quechua punku door, "silver door") or  Sasahui (sasawi) local name for Leucheria daucifolia, -ni an Aymara suffix to indicate ownership, "the one with the sasawi plant", Hispanicized Sasahuini) is a mountain in the Andes of Peru and the name of a lake near the peak. It is situated in the northern extensions of the Vilcanota mountain range in the Cusco Region, Quispicanchi Province, in the districts Ccarhuayo and Ocongate and in the Paucartambo Province, Kosñipata District. Jolljepunco lies northwest of the lake Singrenacocha, southeast of  Minasnioc.

The annual Quyllur Rit'i festival takes place at the foot of the mountains Jolljepunco and Cinajara. The ukukus (Cusco Quechua ukuku spectacled bear (or just 'bear'), also a character in the Andean mythology) of all the groups climb the glaciers of Jolljepunco and spend the night there. They return, carrying on their backs huge ice blocks for the people of their community. The waters of the mountain are believed to heal the body and the mind.

References

Mountains of Peru
Mountains of Cusco Region
Lakes of Cusco Region
Lakes of Peru
Glaciers of Peru